The following is a list of telenovelas and television series produced by Caracol Televisión.

1970s

1980s

1990s

2000s

2010s

2020s

Notes

References 

Caracol
 
Caracol telenovelas